John W Chater was a prominent 19th-century Tyneside publisher, printer and bookseller, with premises in the centre of Newcastle

Brief details
Through his various publications, he ran, each year, several competitions for songwriters and poets. This continued for many years and his prizes were treasured by the winners.

He also published The Northern Journal through his premises at 89 Clayton Street, Newcastle in which, according to an item in the "National Postage Stamp Express" dated 15 June 1864, advertisements cost "20 words for 6d (equivalent to 2½ new pence) and 2d for every additional 8 words"

Works 
These include :-
 Chater's Illustrated Comic Tyneside Almanac for 1862 ... . written I' the Northumberland Dialect egzackly hoo the Newcassel Poaks tawk. By J. P. Robson, .... an' uthor cliwor cheps a' owthor belangin Newcassel, G'yetsid, or sumways else, Published by J. W. Chater, Newcastle upon Tyne – published between (at least) 1862 and 1866 (The 1866 edition had 48 pages)
 The Keelmin's Comic Annewal, for 18??, gi'es ye the best bits o' wit an' wisdim, be the clivvorest cheps aboot Tyneside; Awl M'yed Oot O' Thor Awn Heeds, An 'Lustrayted Wi' Lots Iv Curius An' Clivvor Comic Cuts.Be J. L. Marcke an' C. H. Ross,(B'yeth Reg'lae Cawshins.) Price Sixpence – Reddy Munny – Published by J. W. Chater, 89, Clayton Street, . Copyright – Entered at Stationers'Hall – published between (at least) 1869 and 1883
 Chater's "Canny Newcassel" Diary and Local Remembrancer, For Bissextile or Leap-Year, 1872. Compiled expressly for this district. J. W. Chater, 89, Clayton Street, Newcastle upon Tyne – 1872 (of 154 pages)
 Chater's Annual for 18?? containing – Mirth for Midsummer, Merriment for Michaelmass, Cheerfulness for Christmas, and Laughter for Lady-Day, forming a collection of Parlour Poetry and Drawing Room Drollery, suitable for all seasons; And supplying Smiles for Summer, Amusement for Autumn, Wit for Winter, and Sprightlyness for Spring. Illustrated by J. L. Marcke, Newcastle upon Tyne J. W. Chater, Stationers, 89 Clayton Street, Newcastle upon Tyne.  Entered at Stationers Hall Published between (at least) 1861 and 1882
 Chater's Illustrated Comic Tyneside Almanac for 1862 written in the Northumberland Dialect egzackly hoo the Newcassel Foaks tawk. By J. P. Robson, an' uthor cliwor cheps a' owthor belangin Newcassel, G'yetsid, or sumways else. Published by J. W. Chater, . 1862 – Published between (at least) 1862 and 1875
 Marshall Cresswell's “ Local and other Songs, Recitations, Etc Composed by Marshall Cresswell, Dudley, Northumberland. With Introductory Autobiography (second edition) Illustrated by J. W. Marcke. Newcastle-upon-Tyne. J. W. Chater 61 & 62 Grainger Street, West, 21, Collingwood Street, 89, Clayton Street, and "Cross House", Westgate Road and all Booksellers – A book of some 36 pages in 1876.
 Marshall Cresswell’s ditto – second edition of over 140 pages in 1883
 Northern Rhymes Including “Delaval” and “The Monk” with numerous other pieces, general and local. By the writer of “The Lambton Worm”(and containing some dialect) Published by J. R. Smith of London and J. W. Chater of Newcastle, 1872
 Lawson’s Tyneside Celebrities – Sketches of the lives and labours of Famous Men of the North, published by the author William D Lawson – sold by J. W. Chater, 89 Clayton St, Newcastle 1873

See also 
Geordie dialect words
Cresswell's Local and other Songs and Recitations 1883
Allan's Illustrated Edition of Tyneside Songs and Readings
Chater’s Annual – a yearbook published between 1861-1882
Chater's Canny Newcassel Diary and Remembrancer 1872
Chater’s Keelmin's Comic Annewal – a yearbook published between 1869 and 1883

References

External links
 Bibliography. List of works published in English dialects by W W Skeat & J H Nodal 1877
 Farne archives Chater's Canny Newcassel Diary and Remembrancer 1872 front cover
 Farne archives Chater's Annual for 1877 front cover
 Farne archives Chater's Keelmin's Comic Annewal, for 1869 front cover
Northumberland Words by R O Heslop 1892
Allan’s Illustrated Edition of Tyneside songs and readings

English antiquarians
People from Newcastle upon Tyne (district)
19th-century births
English folk songs
Geordie songwriters
Music publishing companies of the United Kingdom
Music in Newcastle upon Tyne
Year of death missing